The 2006 North West 200 Races took place on Saturday 13 May 2006 at the 8.966 mile circuit, dubbed "The Triangle", based around the towns of Portstewart, Coleraine and Portrush, in Northern Ireland.

Steve Plater and Bruce Anstey both scored double victories at the meeting. Robert Dunlop also recorded the last of his 15 victories, winning the 125 cc event. The current course lap record was set by Steve Plater at  during the Supersport race.

Results
Race 1 – DeWALT Performance Tools Superbike Race (6 laps – 53.66 miles)

Race 2 – Club Soi Portrush 600cc Supersport Race (5 laps – 44.694 miles)

New Lap Record: Bruce Anstey, 116.743 mph

Race 3 – Greenline Hire 250cc Race (5 laps – 44.694 miles)

Race 3a – WRT Group 125/400cc Race (5 laps – 44.694 miles)

New Lap Record: Robert Dunlop, 103.153 mph

Race 4 – CP Hire Superstock Race (5 laps – 44.694 miles)

New Lap Record: Ian Hutchinson, 120.142 mph

Race 5 – Black Horse Motorcycle Finance NW200 Superbike Race (6 laps – 53.66 miles)

New Outright Lap Record: Steve Plater, 124.109 mph

Race 6 – Ballymoney Borough Council 600cc Supersport Race (5 laps – 44.694 miles)

New Lap Record: Ian Hutchinson, 116.881 mph

References

External links
 Official website
 Map of "The Triangle"

2006
2006 in British motorsport
2006 in Northern Ireland sport
North